All Chinese characters are logograms, but several different types can be identified, based on the manner in which they are formed or derived. There are a handful which derive from pictographs and a number which are ideographic in origin, including compound ideographs, but the vast majority originated as phono-semantic compounds. The other categories in the traditional system of classification are rebus or phonetic loan characters and "derivative cognates". Modern scholars have proposed various revised systems, rejecting some of the traditional categories.

In older literature, Chinese characters in general may be referred to as ideograms, due to the misconception that characters represented ideas directly, whereas some people assert that they do so only through association with the spoken word.

Traditional classification
Traditional Chinese lexicography divided characters into six categories. This classification is known from Xu Shen's second century dictionary Shuowen Jiezi, but did not originate there. The phrase first appeared in the Rites of Zhou, though it may not have originally referred to methods of creating characters. When Liu Xin (d. 23 CE) edited the Rites, he glossed the term with a list of six types without examples.
Slightly different lists of six types are given in the Book of Han of the first century CE, and by Zheng Zhong quoted by Zheng Xuan in his first-century commentary on the Rites of Zhou.
Xu Shen illustrated each of Liu's six types with a pair of characters in the postface to the Shuowen Jiezi.

The traditional classification is still taught but is no longer the focus of modern lexicographic practice. Some categories are not clearly defined, nor are they mutually exclusive: the first four refer to structural composition, while the last two refer to usage. For this reason, some modern scholars view them as six principles of character formation rather than six types of characters.

The earliest significant, extant corpus of Chinese characters is found on turtle shells and the bones of livestock, chiefly the scapula of oxen, for use in pyromancy, a form of divination.  These ancient characters are called oracle bone script. Roughly a quarter of these characters are pictograms while the rest are either phono-semantic compounds or compound ideograms. Despite millennia of change in shape, usage and meaning, a few of these characters remain recognizable to the modern reader of Chinese.

At present, more than 90%  of Chinese characters are phono-semantic compounds, constructed out of elements intended to provide clues to both the meaning and the pronunciation. However, as both the meanings and pronunciations of the characters have changed over time, these components are no longer reliable guides to either meaning or pronunciation. The failure to recognize the historical and etymological role of these components often leads to misclassification and false etymology.  A study of the earliest sources (the oracle bones script and the Zhou-dynasty bronze script) is often necessary for an understanding of the true composition and etymology of any particular character. Reconstructing Middle and Old Chinese phonology from the clues present in characters is part of Chinese historical linguistics. In Chinese, it is called Yinyunxue.

Pictograms 

Roughly 600  Chinese characters are pictograms – stylised drawings of the objects they represent. These are generally among the oldest characters.  A few, indicated below with their earliest forms, date back to oracle bones from the twelfth century BCE.

These pictograms became progressively more stylized and lost their pictographic flavour, especially as they made the transition from the oracle bone script to the seal script of the Eastern Zhou, but also to a lesser extent in the transition to the clerical script of the Han dynasty. The table below summarises the evolution of a few Chinese pictographic characters.

Simple ideograms 

Ideograms express an abstract idea through an iconic form, including iconic modification of pictographic characters. In the examples below, low numerals are represented by the appropriate number of strokes, directions by an iconic indication above and below a line, and the parts of a tree by marking the appropriate part of a pictogram of a tree.

N.B.:
  - a tree with the base indicated by an extra stroke.

Compound ideographs  
Compound ideographs, also called associative compounds or logical aggregates, are compounds of two or more pictographic or ideographic characters to suggest the meaning of the word to be represented.
In the postface to the Shuowen Jiezi, Xu Shen gave two examples:
Other characters commonly explained as compound ideographs include:
 , composed of two trees
 , composed of three trees
 , depicting a man by a tree
 , depicting a hand on a bush (later written )
 , depicting a hand above an eye
 , depicting the sun disappearing into the grass, originally written as  enclosing  (later written )

Many characters formerly classed as compound ideographs are now believed to have been mistakenly identified. In many cases, reduction of a character has obscured its original phono-semantic nature. However this form is probably a simplification of an attested alternative form , which can be viewed as a phono-semantic compound.

Peter Boodberg and William Boltz have argued that no ancient characters were compound ideographs. Boltz accounts for the remaining cases by suggesting that some characters could represent multiple unrelated words with different pronunciations, as in Sumerian cuneiform and Egyptian hieroglyphs, and the compound characters are actually phono-semantic compounds based on an alternative reading that has since been lost. Boltz speculates that the character  could represent both the word nǚ < *nrjaʔ "woman" and the word ān < *ʔan "settled", and that the roof signific was later added to disambiguate the latter usage. In support of this second reading, he points to other characters with the same  component that had similar Old Chinese pronunciations:  <  "tranquil",  <  "to quarrel" and  < *kran "licentious". Notably, Christopher Button has shown how more sophisticated palaeographical and phonological analyses can account for Boodberg's and Boltz's proposed examples without relying on polyphony.

While compound ideographs are a limited source of Chinese characters, they form many of the kokuji created in Japan to represent native words.
Examples include:
  hatara(ku) "to work", formed from  person and  move
  tōge "mountain pass", formed from  mountain,  up and  down

As Japanese creations, such characters had no Chinese or Sino-Japanese readings, but a few have been assigned invented Sino-Japanese readings.  For example, the common character  has been given the reading dō (taken from ), and even been borrowed into written Chinese in the 20th century with the reading dòng.

Rebus (phonetic loan) characters 

Jiajie are characters that are "borrowed" to write another morpheme which is pronounced the same or nearly the same. For example, the character  was originally a pictogram of a wheat plant and meant *m-rˁək "wheat". As this was pronounced similar to the Old Chinese word *mə.rˁək "to come",  was also used to write this verb. Eventually the more common usage, the verb "to come", became established as the default reading of the character , and a new character  was devised for "wheat". (The modern pronunciations are lái and mài.) (An example using symbols familiar to English-speakers would be if a beekeeper wrote "This year we bottled £124 weight of honey".)

As in Egyptian hieroglyphs and Sumerian cuneiform, early Chinese characters were used as rebuses to express abstract meanings that were not easily depicted. Thus many characters stood for more than one word. In some cases the extended use would take over completely, and a new character would be created for the original meaning, usually by modifying the original character with a radical (determinative). For instance,  yòu originally meant "right hand; right" but was borrowed to write the abstract word yòu "again; moreover". This process of graphic disambiguation is a common source of phono-semantic compound characters.

While this word jiajie dates from the Han dynasty, the related term tongjia is first attested from the Ming dynasty. (But the character  for "east" has also been explained as a drawing of the sun rising behind a distant tree.) 

According to Bernhard Karlgren, "One of the most dangerous stumbling-blocks in the interpretation of pre-Han texts is the frequent occurrence of [jiajie], loan characters."

Phono-semantic compound characters 
 or 

These form over 90% of Chinese characters.  They were created by combining two components:
 a phonetic component on the rebus principle, that is, a character with approximately the correct pronunciation.
 a semantic component, also called a determinative, one of a limited number of characters which supplied an element of meaning. In most cases this is also the radical under which a character is listed in a dictionary.
As in ancient Egyptian writing, such compounds eliminated the ambiguity caused by phonetic loans (above).

Often, the semantic component is on the left, but there are many possible combinations, see Shape and position of radicals.

Examples 
As an example, a verb meaning "to wash oneself" is pronounced mù. This happens to sound the same as the word mù "tree", which was written with the simple pictograph . The verb mù could simply have been written , like "tree", but to disambiguate, it was combined with the character for "water", giving some idea of the meaning. The resulting character eventually came to be written .

However, the phonetic component is not always as meaningless as this example would suggest. Rebuses were sometimes chosen that were compatible semantically as well as phonetically. It was also often the case that the determinative merely constrained the meaning of a word which already had several.  is a case in point. However,  does not merely provide the pronunciation. In classical texts it was also used to mean "vegetable". That is,  underwent semantic extension from "harvest" to "vegetable", and the addition of  merely specified that the latter meaning was to be understood.

Some additional examples:

Sound change 
Originally characters sharing the same phonetic had similar readings, though they have now diverged substantially. Linguists rely heavily on this fact to reconstruct the sounds of Old Chinese. Contemporary foreign pronunciations of characters are also used to reconstruct historical Chinese pronunciation, chiefly that of Middle Chinese.

When people try to read an unfamiliar compound character, they will typically assume that it is constructed on phonosemantic principles and follow the rule of thumb to "if there is a side, read the side" (yǒu biān dú biān) and take one component to be a phonetic, which often results in errors.  Since the sound changes that had taken place over the two to three thousand years since the Old Chinese period have been extensive, in some instances, the phonosemantic natures of some compound characters have been obliterated, with the phonetic component providing no useful phonetic information at all in the modern language.  For instance,  (yú, /y³⁵/, 'exceed'),  (shū, /ʂu⁵⁵/, 'lose; donate'),  (tōu, /tʰoʊ̯⁵⁵/, 'steal; get by') share the phonetic  (yú, /y³⁵/, 'a surname; agree') but their pronunciations bear no resemblance to each other in Standard Mandarin or in any modern dialect.  In Old Chinese, the phonetic has the reconstructed pronunciation *lo, while the phonosemantic compounds listed above have been reconstructed as *lo, *l̥o, and *l̥ˤo, respectively.  Nonetheless, all characters containing  are pronounced in Standard Mandarin as various tonal variants of yu, shu, tou, and the closely related you and zhu.

Simplification 
Since the phonetic elements of many characters no longer accurately represent their pronunciations, when the People's Republic of China simplified characters, they often substituted a phonetic that was not only simpler to write, but more accurate for a modern reading in Mandarin as well. This has sometimes resulted in forms which are less phonetic than the original ones in varieties of Chinese other than Mandarin. (Note for the example that many determinatives were simplified as well, usually by standardizing cursive forms.)

Derivative cognates 

The derivative cognate is the smallest category and also the least understood. In the postface to the Shuowen Jiezi, Xu Shen gave as an example the characters  kǎo "to verify" and  lǎo "old", which had similar Old Chinese pronunciations (*khuʔ and *C-ruʔ respectively) and may have had the same etymological root, meaning "elderly person", but became lexicalized into two separate words. The term does not appear in the body of the dictionary, and may have been included in the postface out of deference to Liu Xin.  It is often omitted from modern systems.

Modern classifications
The liùshū had been the standard classification scheme for Chinese characters since Xu Shen's time. Generations of scholars modified it without challenging the basic concepts. Tang Lan (1902–1979) was the first to dismiss liùshū, offering his own sānshū, namely xiàngxíng, xiàngyì and xíngshēng. This classification was later criticised by Chen Mengjia (1911–1966) and Qiu Xigui. Both Chen and Qiu offered their own sānshū.

See also
Radicals in Chinese characters
 Chinese writing
 Chinese calligraphy
 Japanese writing
 Stroke order
Ateji, Chinese characters used phonetically in Japanese
 Transliteration into Chinese characters, Chinese characters used phonetically
 Xiesheng series

References

Citations

Sources 

 This page draws heavily on the French Wikipedia page Classification des sinogrammes, retrieved 12 April 2005.
 
 
 
 
 
 
 
 
  (English translation of Wénzìxué Gàiyào , Shangwu, 1988.)
  (preprint)

Further reading
(Harvard University)(Translated by Lionel Charles Hopkins) (Note:Tond Dai and T'ung Tai are the same person, he was counted as two authors on google books)
(Translated by Lionel Charles Hopkins, Walter Perceval Yetts)
(Translated by L. C. Hopkins )

External links

 Images of the Different character classifications
 The Silver Horde: Mongol Scripts
 Image of pictograms in Hanzi

Hanja
Kanji
Chinese characters